Onaaigal Jakkiradhai is a 2018 Indian Tamil-language horror drama film written, directed and produced by JPR while music is composed by Adheesh Uthriyan. It stars Kabali Vishwanth, Riythvika, and Baby Amrutha in the lead roles. The music was composed by Addheesh Uthrian with cinematography by Magesh K. Dev and editing by Deepak. It was released on 5 January 2018 and met with negative reviews.

The film is about what unemployed youngsters do for money. Riythvika portrays a ghost in the film.

Plot
Anjali (Baby Amrutha) is the only child of a rich couple (Vijay Krishnaraj and Nithya Ravindran), who is born after 16 years of their marriage. Anjali is raised with so much love and affection by her parents. Azhagu (Kabali Vishwanth) is Anjali's maternal uncle who just roams around with his friends Chithappu (A. Venkatesh), Saravanan (Adams), and Pandi (Kasion). All four friends are badly in need of money for different reasons. Although Azhagu is fond of Anjali, he devises a plan to kidnap her and extract money from her father. As per plan, Anjali is kidnapped and held as a hostage in an isolated bungalow where Chithappu works as a security guard. Azhagu's friends call Anjali's father and demand one crore rupees as ransom for which he agrees. Anjali's father gives the money to Azhagu's friends and cries to Azhagu that he is even ready to give 10 crores for the sake of his daughter. This makes Azhagu extract more money from Anjali's father.

Azhagu informs his friends to threaten Anjali's father by asking for another 3 crore rupees. Anjali's father agrees and gives the required money to kidnappers. Azhagu is still not convinced and wanted to extract more money from Anjali's father, but his friends are against this plan and remind him of a flashback. A few months back, Azhagu and his friends kidnap Varshini (Riythvika) with plans of extracting money from her father, but her father files a police complaint. This angers Azhagu, and he kills Varshini and buries her body at the backyard of the same bungalow and places a plate given by a tantric. Now, when the four friends keep discussing among themselves in the bungalow, Anjali sees Azhagu and finds out that her uncle is behind this kidnap. Azhagu is shocked, but his friends come up with a plan of killing Anjali. Although Azhagu does not like this plan, he is left with no option. Chithappu kills Anjali and buries her near to Varshini's grave at the backyard.

The four friends experience some strange events in the bungalow, and they understand that it is Anjali's soul that is haunting them as they have not placed any tantric plate over Anjali's grave. Meanwhile, Anjali's parents worry about her whereabouts, and her father gets paralyzed. Anjali's soul threatens the friends, making them remove the tantric plate from Varshini's grave, making her soul come out. Varshini's soul comes out and murders all four friends.

Cast
Kabali Vishwanth as Azhagesan (Azhagu), Anjali's uncle
Riythvika as Varshini
Baby Amrutha as Anjali
A. Venkatesh as Chithappu
Adams as Saravanan
Kasion as Pandi
Vijay Krishnaraj as Anjali's father
Nithya Ravindran as Anjali's mother

Reception
A critic from The New Indian Express wrote that "The film shows the depravity of the human soul and the depths it plumbs in pursuit of what it truly wants". The Times of India Samayam gave the film a rating of two out of five stars. The critic praised the story and criticized certain illogical dialogues.

References

External links

2018 films
2018 horror films
Indian ghost films
2010s ghost films
2010s Tamil-language films
Indian horror films